Juif may refer to:

Juif, a Jewish ethnonym in French language for Jewish male. The equivalent for females is juive.
Juif, Saône-et-Loire, a commune in the Saône-et-Loire department in the region of Bourgogne in eastern France
 Jamiat Ulema-e-Islam (F)